For an overview of microcomputers of different kinds, see the following lists of microcomputers:

List of early microcomputers
List of home computers
List of home computers by video hardware

Lists of computer hardware